Governor Cornwallis may refer to:

Charles Cornwallis, 1st Marquess Cornwallis (1738–1805), Governor-General of the Presidency of Fort William in 1805
Edward Cornwallis (1713–1776), Governor of Nova Scotia from 1749 to 1752 and Governor of Gibraltar from 1761 to 1776
 Governor Cornwallis (ferry), a ferry that operated on the Halifax–Dartmouth Ferry Service

See also
Thomas Cornwallis (1605–1675), Commissioner of the Province of Maryland